Ngwanamakwetle Reneiloe Mashabela is a South African politician from the Economic Freedom Fighters party. She has been a Member of Parliament (MP) in the National Assembly of South Africa since May 2014. Mashabela is a member of the central command team of the EFF.

Career
Mashabela joined the Economic Freedom Fighters in 2013. She was elected to the National Assembly of South Africa in the general election held on 7 May 2014. Mashabela was sworn in as a Member of Parliament on 21 May 2014.

In November 2014, house chairperson Cedric Frolick ordered sergeant-at-arms Regina Mohlomi to remove Mashabela from the house after she repeatedly called president Jacob Zuma a "thief" and refused to withdraw. Riot police came in to remove her from the chamber. Mashabela said that she was "traumatised" from the experience.

At the EFF's conference in December 2014, she was elected to the central command team as an additional member.

Mashabela was re-elected as an MP in May 2019. She was re-elected to the central command team of the EFF in December 2019. Before she joined politics she was a primary school teacher at Nokane primary school in Ditshošing/Shawela village in Bolobedu.

References

External links

Living people
People from Limpopo
Year of birth missing (living people)
Members of the National Assembly of South Africa
Women members of the National Assembly of South Africa
Economic Freedom Fighters politicians